Nalut (sometimes Lalút) is the capital of the Nalut District in Libya. Nalut lies approximately halfway between Tripoli and Ghadames, at the western end of the Nafusa Mountains coastal range, in the Tripolitania region.

The town is a long-time Berber community and a cultural centre for them, with a festival held in the spring to revive and promote the local culture, traditions, industries and art of the Amazigh people.

History

Name
The name Nalut and its alternate Lalut may derive from the pagan Berber goddess of springs, Tala. As Nalut is only 60 km from the Tunisian border and lies close to some oases it played an important part in the caravan trade.

Architecture
Nalut is home to the Qasr Nalut ⵣⴰⵙⵔⵓ ⵏ ⵏⴰⵍⵓⵜ, which is a granary fortified by a ksour (castle). The facility has been abandoned but is a tourist destination. The fortress was a communal building where the local families could store their grain in times of conflict.

The Alal'a Mosque – which is Nalut's oldest mosque – was rebuilt in 1312 CE.

Libyan civil war
A monument to Muammar Gaddafi's Green Book in the town square was demolished during the Libyan Civil War.

In late April 2011, "Radio Free Nalut" began broadcasting in the city. It was one of several rebel-controlled radio stations established during the civil war and conducted broadcasts in Berber.

A national reconciliation conference for the factions in the Libyan Civil War was held in Nalut in September 2016.

Museum
Nalut contains the Nalut Dinosaur Museum, which exhibits fossil trees, crocodiles and dinosaurs which have been discovered in the vicinity of the town since the first find in 1998.

See also 
 List of cities in Libya
 2011 Nafusa Mountains Campaign
 Nalut Dinosaur Museum

Notes and references

External links

Populated places in Nalut District
Tripolitania
Baladiyat of Libya
Berber populated places